John Lovell Horsley (21 July 1920 – 12 January 2014) was a British actor.

He was born in Westcliff-on-Sea, Essex, England. The son of a doctor, he made his acting debut at the Theatre Royal in Bournemouth. After appearing in repertory theatres he was called up for military service in the Royal Devon Yeomanry, in which he served in Sicily and Italy during the Second World War. He then contracted hepatitis and become a member of an Army drama company that toured military units.

Horsley's early career as a professional actor saw him playing a succession of doctors and policemen, including a doctor in the film Hell Drivers (1957) and a policeman in the television show Big Breadwinner Hog (1969). He was more prolific in television from the 1960s, and played character roles in many series and programmes including The Lotus Eaters (1972–73) and The Duchess of Duke Street (1976–77). He is perhaps best known for his role as Doc Morrissey in the BBC sitcom The Fall and Rise of Reginald Perrin (1976–79), in which his catchphrase was "Take two aspirins."  He reprised the role in The Legacy of Reginald Perrin in 1996. He also starred in the 1980s comedy series My Husband and I.

He played Giles Rowley in "The Colonel's Lady" (1988), an episode of Tales of the Unexpected. He played Sir Ralph Shawcross in the BBC sitcom You Rang, M'Lord? (1990–93) and the Bishop of Tatchester in the BBC's adaptation of John Masefield's The Box of Delights (1984). He appeared  as Professor Wanstead in Nemesis, an episode of Miss Marple, in 1987, and as Edward Tressilian in Hercule Poirot's Christmas, an episode of Agatha Christie's Poirot, in 1995. He also appeared as Clive in "Co-respondents Course", an episode of the sitcom Hi-de-Hi. His final role was in the TV mini-series Rebecca in 1997.

Horsley was married to the actress June Marshall (1923–1988) from 1948 until her death, and they had two daughters. 

He died on 12 January 2014 at Denville Hall, a retirement home for actors.

Selected filmography

 Highly Dangerous (1950) – Customs officer
 Blackmailed (1951) – Maggie's doctor
 The Quiet Woman (1951) – Inspector Bromley
 Appointment with Venus (1951) – Naval Officer Kent
 Encore (1951) – Joe, Mate (segment "Winter Cruise")
 The Frightened Man (1952) – Harry Armstrong
 The Lost Hours (1952) – Brown
 The Long Memory (1953) – Bletchley
 Time Bomb (1953) – Constable Charles Baron
 Deadly Nightshade (1953) – Inspector Clements
 Sailor of the King (1953) – Commander John Willis
 Wheel of Fate (1953) – Detective Sergeant Simpson
 Recoil (1953) – Inspector Trubridge
 Personal Affair (1953) – Parson (uncredited)
 Meet Mr. Malcolm (1954) – Tony Barlow
 Impulse (1954) – Police officer
 The Maggie (1954) – Man in office (uncredited)
 The Runaway Bus (1954) – Inspector Henley
 Double Exposure (1954) – Lamport
 Night People (1954) – Lieutenant Colonel Stanways
 Forbidden Cargo (1954) – Customs officer (uncredited)
 Father Brown (1954) – Inspector Wilkins
 Delayed Action (1954) – Worsley
 Seagulls Over Sorrento (1954) – John Phillips – doctor / surgeon (uncredited)
 Up to His Neck (1954) – Navigating officer (uncredited)
 Mad About Men (1954) – Sports organiser (uncredited)
 The Brain Machine (1955) – Dr Richards
 Above Us the Waves (1955) – Lieutenant Anderson
 Little Red Monkey (1955) – Det. Sgt Gibson
 Barbados Quest (1955) – Det. Insp. Taylor
 They Can't Hang Me (1955) – Assistant Commissioner
 A Time to Kill (1955) – Peter Hastings
 Bond of Fear (1956) – Motorcycle policeman
 Breakaway (1956) – Michael Matlock
 The Weapon (1956) – Johnson
 Circus Friends (1956) – Bert Marlow
 Yangtse Incident: The Story of H.M.S. Amethyst (1957) – Chief staff officer
 Stranger in Town (1957) – Inspector Powell
 Hell Drivers (1957) – Doctor attending Gino
 Man in the Shadow (1957) – Alan Peters
 Barnacle Bill (1957) – First surgeon
 Dunkirk (1958) – Padre
 Stormy Crossing (1958) – Detective Inspector Parry
 Operation Amsterdam (1959) – Commander Bowerman
 Ben-Hur (1959) – Spintho (uncredited)
 A Touch of Larceny (1959) – First editor (uncredited)
 Wrong Number (1959) – Superintendent Blake
 Sink the Bismarck! (1960) – Captain (Sheffield)
 Seven Keys (1961) – Police sergeant (opening scene)
 The Secret Ways (1961) – Jon Brainbridge
 The Sinister Man (1961) – Pathologist
 Serena (1962) – Mr Fisher
 Jigsaw (1962) – Superintendent Ramsey (uncredited)
 Night of the Prowler (1962) – Detective Inspector Cameron
 Return to Sender (1963) – Superintendent Gilchrist
 Panic (1963) – Inspector Malcolm
 The Comedy Man (1964) – Co-pilot (uncredited)
 Where the Bullets Fly (1966) – Air Marshal
 The Limbo Line (1968) – Richards
 Secrets (1983) – Dr Jefferies
 The Doctor and the Devils (1985) – Dr Mackendrick
 The Fourth Protocol (1987) – Sir Anthony Plumb
 Stanley's Dragon (1994) – Mr Little

References

External links

1920 births
2014 deaths
English male stage actors
English male film actors
English male television actors
Male actors from Essex
British Army personnel of World War II
People from Westcliff-on-Sea
Royal Devon Yeomanry officers
Military personnel from Southend-on-Sea